Réttur (Right) is an Icelandic television series created and produced by Sigurjón Kjartansson of RVK Studios, retitled Case and The Court in English-language markets. It was picked up by NBC and producer Howard Gordon for a US remake. Seasons 1 and 2 feature a different case every episode, while season 3 is a single case that gets solved throughout the season.

Plot 
Réttur is about Logi Traustason, an attorney who joins a law firm owned by business partners Brynhildur and Hörður. Together they solve court cases which often brings them all too close to their cases and subjects of the Icelandic society.

Characters 
 Logi Traustason
Logi is an attorney of law. After spending years in prison for a murder he did not commit  he opens his own law practice. His office gets bankrupted and he starts working his way up at another firm. After two years he does not get the partner position he is expecting, and leaves the firm to join Réttur, a small firm facing financial difficulties, owned by Brynhildur and Hörður. Logi is an alcoholic and quite the ladies man, finding it hard to stay true to only one woman. He and Brynhildur do not always see things eye to eye.

References

External links 
 

2000s Icelandic television series
2010s Icelandic television series
2000s drama television series
2010s drama television series
2000s legal television series
2010s legal television series
Icelandic drama television series
Icelandic legal television series
Television shows set in Iceland
Television shows set in Reykjavík
Thriller television series
Stöð 2 original programming